Lignispalta is a genus of moths of the family Noctuidae.

Species
 Lignispalta caerulea (Robinson, 1969)
 Lignispalta diversisigna (Prout, 1928)
 Lignispalta incertissima (Bethune-Baker, 1906)
 Lignispalta viridaria (Swinhoe, 1902)

References
Natural History Museum Lepidoptera genus database
Lignispalta at funet

Hadeninae